is a Japanese singer, entertainer, actor, and a member of the singer-songwriter duo WaT and belongs to the production company Burning Productions.

Early career
Born in Mitaka, Tokyo to a Japanese mother and a German American father, Wentz became involved in the entertainment industry at a very young age. Wentz initially started as a model at the age of four and made his acting debut as the role of Chip in the Four Seasons Musical Troupe production of Beauty and the Beast. He became famous as a child actor as a regular on the NHK television show, where he played bass guitar and piano at the age of ten. During live performances, he played the acoustic bass as well as the keyboard. He started learning the guitar from the age of 17. He is featured in the popular rock band Luna Sea's music video for their 1996 single "In Silence".

He originally wanted to be a fashion model, but he was too short to become one. When he terminated his contract with Tensai Terebi-kun, he decided to get away from show-business, but after the recommendation of Hiromi Go, he entered Burning Productions and became a tarento.

He began his acting career at the age of 18, when he played a minor role in the NHK television series Toshiie To Matsu.

In 2007, he started to appear in several of Cocorico's comedy shows as Shorty Tanaka (ちっこい田中, Little Tanaka) and since Tensai Terebi Kun, he is a deshi (student) of Yoshimoto comedian Hōsei Tsukitei.

Musical career 
After Tensai Terebi-kun ended, Wentz continued to play music and started the band WaT with Teppei Koike. They started in 2002 with street performances. In February 2004, they released an indie-label CD. In August 2005, they signed with Universal Music Group and had their major debut in November 2005.

Popularity 
His popularity may be derived from his self-mocking "comedian" character, as he often talks about his "foolishness", short height, and difficulty in speaking English.

Personal life
Wentz is a follower of the baseball team Saitama Seibu Lions. He was once invited to the Lions' victory ceremony in 2008, and has a large collection of baseball cards. He also has over 800 volumes of manga.

Works

Variety television
 Hayami English Network (1994–1995)
 Tensai Terebi-kun / Tensai Terebi-kun Wide (April 1995 – March 2000)
 Chikara no Kagiri Go Go Go!! (October 2001 – February 2002)
 Shūkan Tokudane Kazoku!! (October 2002 – December 2002)
 F2/F2-X (October 2002 – September 2004)
 Nōnai Esthe IQ Supli (May 2004 – March　2009, as host)
 Pretty Kids (October 2004 – March 2005, as host)
 Hanataka Tengu (April 2005 – September 2005)
 Barioku! (October 2005 – March 2006, as host)
 Ame nimo Makezu (April 2006 – September 2006, as host)
 Ainori (April 2006 – March　2009, as host)
 Ponkikki (April 2006 – March 2007, as host)
 D no Gekijō (September 2006 – September 2007)
 Dokusen! Kinyōbi no Kokuhaku (October 2007 – March　2008)
 Kentei Japon (April 2008 – September 2008)
 Atarashii Nami 16 (October 2008 – March 2009, as host)
 Jinsei motto mankitsu　hour　Tokimeke! Week wonder (October　2008 – February　2009)
 Sakiyomi (July 2008–present)
 Super Surprise (April 2009–present, as host)
 Minna no Enquete Show Honne no Dendou!! Shinsuke niha wakarumai (May 2009–present)

Television dramas
 Kyūmei Senshi Nano Seibaa (1995), a drama within the NHK show Tensai Terebi-kun
 Toshiie and Matsu (2002) as Mori Ranmaru
 Tentei Kazoku (2002) as Tomoda Yūki
 Gokusen, part 6 guest star (2002) as Yūki Masato
 Raion Sensei (2003) as Furuta Takumi
 Fujiko Hemingu no Kiseki (2003) as Ōtsuki Urufu
 Aa, Tantei Jimusho, part 3 guest star (2004) as Inaba Yusuke
 Tadashii Renai no Susume (2005) as Takeda Hiroaki
 Rondo, part 1-2 guest star (2006) as Toda Masato
 Kirakira Kenshūi (2007) as Tachioka Ken
 Nodame Cantabile in Europe Lesson 1 & 2 (2008) as Franck
 Wagaya no Rekishi (2010) as Maruyama Akihiro
 Japan Sinks: People of Hope (2021) as Taira Ishizuka

Movies

 Kamen Rider The First (2005) Mitamura Haruhiko
 Animation movie Brave Story (2006) Ashikawa Mitsuru
 Lovely Complex (2006) Dancing Yoshiko
 Captain Tokio (2007) Furuta
 Gegege no Kitarō (2007) Kitarō
 Gegege no Kitarō: Sennen Noroi Uta (2008) Kitarō
 Nodame Cantabile: Saishū Gakushō (Part 2) (2010) Franck
 Tiger Mask (2013) Naoto Date / Tiger Mask
 Yudō (2023)

Dubbing
 Arthur Christmas, Arthur Claus
 Jack the Giant Slayer, Jack
 Trolls World Tour, Branch

Solo singles
 Awaking Emotion 8/5 / my brand new way (April 27, 2007)

References

External links 
 Official site 
 WaT Official site 
 Universal Music site 

Japanese male actors
Japanese male pop singers
Japanese people of American descent
Japanese people of German descent
People from Musashino, Tokyo
1985 births
Living people
Musicians from Western Tokyo
21st-century Japanese singers
21st-century Japanese male singers